TBS may stand for:

Entertainment 
 Taipei Broadcasting Station, a radio station in Taipei, Taiwan
 Tokyo Broadcasting System, a stock holding company in Tokyo, Japan
 TBS Television (Japan), a television station
 TBS Radio, a radio station
 BS-TBS, a satellite broadcasting station in Tokyo, Japan
 Turner Broadcasting System, media company in the United States
 TBS (American TV channel), a cable television channel in the United States
 TBS (Latin American TV channel), the Latin American channel
 Traffic Broadcasting System, a radio and television broadcaster in Seoul, South Korea
 Taking Back Sunday, an American rock band from Long Island, New York

Education 
 TBS Education, France. The Grande école formerly known as: Toulouse Business School
 Tau Beta Sigma, an honorary band sorority
 The Basic School, US Marine Corps
 Therapeutic boarding school

Transport 
 Tbilisi International Airport, an airport in Georgia, IATA code
 Terminal Bersepadu Selatan, transportation terminal in Kuala Lumpur, Malaysia

Office products 
 Toshiba Business Solutions, a US-based subsidiary of Toshiba TEC Corporation

Other uses 
 Tablespoonful as a unit of measure, tbs
 Tafawa Balewa Square, Lagos, Nigeria
 Talk Between Ships, short range VHF radio; see Charles Momsen#World War II
 The Bethesda system, for reporting cervical cytologic diagnoses
 TBS GB, a UK healthcare services company
 Treasury Board Secretariat, the administrative branch of the Treasury Board of Canada
 Tris-buffered saline, a biochemical buffer
 Temple Beth Sholom (Cherry Hill, New Jersey), a synagogue
 Turn-based strategy game, in which players take turns
 Tert-butyldimethylsilyl group of silyl ethers; see Tert-Butyldimethylsilyl chloride
 Tanguat language, ISO 639-3 code tbs
 Trinitarian Bible Society
 Thomas Brodie Sangster, a British actor, abbreviated TBS
 Torneo Superior de Baloncesto, a Dominican basketball tournament
 Townes–Brocks syndrome, a rare genetic condition